Katiya is a traditional Nepalese cuisine consisting of mutton curry cooked in clay pots over a coal bed native to Maithil community of Nepalese side and originated from the Maithili language speaking Katahariya town of Rautahat district. It is also popular among Rajbanshi, Bhojpuri and Tharu people of Terai.

Katiya is prepared by mixing spices, chilies, garlic and onion with mutton. Salt, turmeric and oil is added in the earthen pot and the mutton is put in it. The earthen pot is then cooked inside coal for about half hour. It is served with rice, chapati or bhooja.

References

Nepalese curries
Lamb dishes